Tangancícuaro is a municipio (municipality) in the Mexican state of Michoacán, western Mexico.

The municipal seat is the City of Tangancícuaro de Arista.

Geography
Tangancícuaro is at an altitude of 1,700 meters above sea level, with an area of 387.95 km². Its population was estimated at 33,815 in 1996 and has a slightly negative population growth attributed to emigration to the interior and outside of the country.

It is bordered on the north by Zamora, Jacona and Tlazazalca, to the east by Purépero and Chilchota, to the south by Charapan, Los Reyes  and Tingüindin, and to the west by Tangamandapio.

Its distance to the Michoacán State Capital is 134 kilometers.

The economy is based on agriculture with some industry and tourism.

Nature
Natural features include the Duero River, Lake Junguarán, Lake Camécuaro, and Lake Cupatziro.

Tourist destinations include Lago de Camécuaro National Park, the location of Lake Camécuaro (Lago de Camécuaro).

See also
Lago de Camécuaro National Park
Municipalities of Michoacán

External links
Michoacán website: Tangancícuaro 
Maps-of-mexico.com: Municipalities of Michoacán
 mx.groups.yahoo.com/group/tangancicuaro

Municipalities of Michoacán